Pogány is a village in Baranya county, Hungary.

Location 
Pogány is located south of Pécs, near Hungary's Highway 58.

History 
The first written record of Pogány dates to 1181, with the village's church to St. Barbara appearing as early as 1334. During the Ottoman occupation of Hungary, the village was depopulated, but slowly regained population.

Population 
In the 2011 census, 90.1% of the population were Hungarian, 0.2% Bulgarian, 1.3% Romani, 10.4% Croatian, 15.1% German, 0.3% Serb, and 0.3% Ukrainian. The religious distribution was as follows; 39.8% Roman Catholic, 10.7% Reformed, 3.2% Lutheran, 1.1% Greek Catholic, 22.2% non-denominational (20.8% did not declare their religion).

References

External links 
 Street map 

Populated places in Baranya County